Thiruneelakandar is 1972 Indian Tamil-language biographical film, directed by C P Jambulingam and produced by K. Selvaraj. The film script and lyrics were written by Kannadasan and Panchu Arunachalam. Music was by C. N. Pandurangan. It stars T. R. Mahalingam playing the title role of Tirunilakanta Nayanar, with Sowcar Janaki, R. S. Manohar, M. Bhanumathi and Gandhimathi in supporting roles. It was released on 3 June 1972.

Plot 

The movie narrates the life tale of Thiruneelakandar. Originally agnostic, he becomes a staunch devotee of Lord Shiva singing his own composed hymns. He gets married to Neelavathy and leads a pious life as a potter. However, he embarks on an affair with Kalavathy which leads to estrangement from his wife vowing to never touch her or any other woman ever again. He goes on singing praises of the lord into ripe old age until the lord appears as an old hermit, puts him to test and  revives the couple's youth and taking them with him.

Cast 
 T. R. Mahalingam as Ambalavaanar/Thiruneelakandar
 Sowcar Janaki as Neelavathy
 R. S. Manohar as Lord Shiva
 M. Bhanumathi as Kalavathy
 Gandhimathi as Sinthamani
 Suruli Rajan as Murugan
 Pushpamala as Valli
A. Veerappan as Singaram
 S. D. Subbulakshmi as Woman Saint
Usilaimani as Chinna Paiya

Soundtrack 
Music was composed by C. N. Pandurangan and lyrics were written by Kannadasan and Panju Arunachalam.

References

External links 
 

1970s biographical films
1970s musical films
1970s Tamil-language films
1972 films
Films about Hinduism
Films about royalty
Hindu devotional films
Hindu mythological films
Indian biographical films
Indian black-and-white films
Indian epic films
Indian films based on actual events
Indian musical films
Religious epic films
Films scored by C. N. Pandurangan